Dalen Portland may refer to:

Dalen Portland (novel), a 1978 novel by Kjartan Fløgstad
Dalen Portland Cementfabrikk, now Norcem Brevik